Tephritis heliophila is a species of tephritid or fruit flies in the genus Tephritis of the family Tephritidae.

Distribution
France, Germany, Austria, Switzerland.

References

Tephritinae
Insects described in 1927
Diptera of Europe